Purabi Bormudoi (8 May 1950 - 15 July 2019) was an Indian writer in the Assamese language, known for her social and periodical novels and short stories. She was awarded the Sahitya Akademi Award in the Assamese language in 2007 for her novel Shantanukulanandan, a saga of the mighty Brahmaputra River

Early life and education
Puarabi Bormudoi was born on May 8, 1950 at Deurigaon, a remote village near Tezpur town of Sonitpur District of Assam, She passed matriculation in 1967 from Tezpur Higher Secondary and Multipurpose Girls’ School. Bormudoi went to Gauhati University after completing graduation in History honours from Darrang  College in 1970. In 1973 she completed her master's degree in History from Gauhati University and decided to become a full-time author. Her first novel Gajaraj, Prem Aru Banditva was serialized in Gariyoshi, a literary magazine of Assam in 1998. In 1975 she was married to Dr. Ananda Bormudoi, a literary critic, writer and translator of Assam.

Death
After a severe accident in 2006, Purabi Bormudoi spent her life in a wheelchair until her death. On July 15, 2019, following a prolonged illness, she died at Gauhati Medical College and Hospital, Assam.

Novels
 গজৰাজ, প্ৰেম আৰু বন্দীত্ব "Gajaraj, Prem Aru Banditva", 1999
 বাঘজাল, বাঘশাল আৰু মানুহ "Baghshal, Baghjal Aru Manuh", 2000
 ৰূপোৱালী নৈৰ সোণোৱালী ঘাট "Rupowali Noir Sonowali Ghat", 2001
 শান্তনুকুলনন্দন "Shantanukulanandan", 2005
 এটা আলিবাটৰ ইতিকথা "Eta Alibatar Itikatha", 2008

Novellas
 পৰম পূজনীয় আৰু দুখন উপন্যাসিকা "Param Pujaniya Aru Dukhan Upanyasika", 2004
 নি্বাচিত উপন্যাসিকা "Nirbachit Upanyasika", 2005

Short Stories
 শীতৰ কুঁৱলী "Sheetar Kuwnali", 1977
 পূৰৱী বৰমুদৈৰ নিৰ্বাচিত গল্প (প্ৰথম খণ্ড) "Purabi Bormudoir Nirbachit Galpa", Vol. I, 2002
 পূৰৱী বৰমুদৈৰ নিৰ্বাচিত গল্প (দ্বিতীয় খণ্ড) "Purabi Bormudoir Nirbachit Galpa", Vol. II, 2005
 হেৰোৱাজনক  বিচাৰি আৰু অন্যান্য গল্প "Heruajanak Bichari Aru Anyanya Galpa", 2014
 পূৰৱী বৰমুদৈৰ নিৰ্বাচিত গল্প (তৃতীয় খণ্ড)  "Purabi Bormudoir Nirbachit Galpa", Vol. III, 2015
 অৱশেষত বৰষুণ 'Abasheshat Barashun', 2017
 সপোনৰ ঘৰ ঘৰৰ সপোন 'Saponar Ghar Gharar Sapon', 2018
 ৰ'দৰ ৰং 'Rodar Rang', 2019

Awards
 In 2000 received Basanti Bordoloi Literary Award for Gajaraj, Prem Aru Banditva.
 In 2005 received first Lekhika Samaroh Bota for life time achievement.
 In 2007 received Sahitya Akademi Award  for Shantanukulanandan.
 In 2007 received Prabina Saikia Award for Life time achievement.
 In 2007 received Saganlal Jain Award for the novel Rupowali Noir Sonowali Ghat.
 In 2011 received Assam Valley Literary Award for Life time achievement

References 

1950 births
2019 deaths
Indian women writers
Writers from Assam
Assamese-language writers
Gauhati University alumni
People from Tezpur
Recipients of the Sahitya Akademi Award in Assamese